Albu Hardan-e Olya (also Romanized as Ālbū Ḩardān-e ‘Olyā; also known as Abū Ḩardān-e ‘Olyā, Bahārdān, and Bahārdān-e Bālā) is a village in Jarahi Rural District, in the Central District of Mahshahr County, Khuzestan Province, Iran. At the 2006 census, its population was 100, in 22 families.

References 

Populated places in Mahshahr County